Salisbury Township may refer to:

 Salisbury Township, Sangamon County, Illinois
 Salisbury Township, Chariton County, Missouri, in Chariton County, Missouri
 Salisbury Township, Rowan County, North Carolina
 Salisbury Township, Meigs County, Ohio
 Salisbury Township, Lancaster County, Pennsylvania
 Salisbury Township, Lehigh County, Pennsylvania
 Salisbury Township School District

Township name disambiguation pages